Stefan Velev (born 2 May 1989) is a Bulgarian professional footballer who plays as a midfielder for Cherno More Varna.

Career
Born in Sofia, Velev played for Septemvri as a schoolboy, before joining Slavia Sofia. But he found it difficult to break into the first team due to the consistency of Slavčo Georgievski and Pavle Popara.

In June 2008 Velev signed a two-year contract with Lokomotiv Stara Zagora. He made his B PFG and Lokomotiv debut on 9 August in a home 1–0 against Shumen, scoring the goal of the win.

On 13 March 2017, Velev signed a -year contract with Slavia Sofia.  He left the club at the end of the 2017–18 season when his contract expired.

On 15 June 2018, Velev signed with Sepsi OSK.

International career
Velev earned his first cap for Bulgaria on 29 May 2012, after coming on as a second-half substitute in the 0–2 loss against Turkey in an exhibition game.

National team

Honours
Slavia Sofia
 Bulgarian Cup (1): 2017–18

References

External links
 
 

1989 births
Living people
Footballers from Sofia
Bulgarian footballers
Bulgaria youth international footballers
Bulgaria under-21 international footballers
Bulgaria international footballers
Bulgarian expatriate footballers
First Professional Football League (Bulgaria) players
Second Professional Football League (Bulgaria) players
Erovnuli Liga players
Liga I players
FC Lyubimets players
PFC Beroe Stara Zagora players
PFC Levski Sofia players
PFC Lokomotiv Plovdiv players
FC Dinamo Tbilisi players
PFC Slavia Sofia players
Sepsi OSK Sfântu Gheorghe players
PFC Cherno More Varna players
Expatriate footballers in Georgia (country)
Expatriate footballers in Romania
Bulgarian expatriate sportspeople in Romania
Association football midfielders
Bulgarian expatriate sportspeople in Georgia (country)